University Peak is a thirteener in the Sierra Nevada. It is named for the University of California. It is on the Sierra crest between Mount Gould to the north, and Mount Bradley to the south. It lies on the boundary between Tulare County and  Inyo County. Its west side is in Kings Canyon National Park while the east face is in the John Muir Wilderness.

The nearest trailhead to University Peak is Onion Valley. The least technical route to its summit is an off-trail hike up the south slopes. It offers a variety of other routes from easy scrambles to rock climbing. The more challenging routes led the Sierra Club's Sierra Peaks Section to list University Peak as a Mountaineers Peak.

References

External links 

Mountains of Kings Canyon National Park
Mountains of the John Muir Wilderness
Mountains of Tulare County, California
Mountains of Inyo County, California
Mountains of Northern California